Fire Station No. 15 may refer to:

 Fire Station No. 15 (Birmingham, Alabama), listed on the National Register of Historic Places (NRHP)
Fire Station No. 15 (Denver, Colorado), a Denver Landmark
 Fire Station No. 15 (Tacoma, Washington), NRHP-listed

See also
List of fire stations